Arthur Osborn  (16 December 1878, Sonning, Berkshire, UK – 24 February 1964, Kew, London) was an English gardener, botanist and arborist.

Arthur's Osborn's father, Brewer Osborn, gained a considerable reputation as a horticulturalist and was a gardener at Holme Park, Sonning from 
1870 to 1898. In 1899 Arthur Osborn became a gardener at the Royal Botanic Gardens, Kew. At the Kew Arboretum he was appointed an assistant curator and was eventually promoted to deputy curator. He was in charge of the Kew Arboretum during the 1930s. His 1933 book Shrubs and Trees for the Garden showed his "extensive practical experience in arboriculture".

Selected publications

References

1878 births
1964 deaths
Arborists
English botanists
English gardeners
Botanists active in Kew Gardens
19th-century British botanists
20th-century British botanists
Members of the Order of the British Empire